Kryvyi Rih and Nikopol diocese - Eparchy of the Ukrainian Orthodox Church (Moscow Patriarchate) centered in Kryvyy Rih, Ukraine. Cathedral city - Kryvyy Rih. Cathedral - Spaso-Preobrazhensky (Kryvyi Rih), Transfiguration (Nikopol).

Founded on 27 July 1996, by decision of the Holy Synod of the Ukrainian Orthodox Church, of the release of the Dnepropetrovsk diocese. Decision of the Holy Synod on 12 September 1996 by Bishop Kryvyi Rih and Nikopol was defined as Archimandrite Ephraim, inhabitants of Kiev-Pechersk Lavra.

For ten years, the number of parishes in the territory of the diocese increased from 85 to 224, and clergy from 98 to 202.

Churches 
The oldest churches in the cathedral city of Kryvyi Rih diocese are:

 church of St. Nicolas in Kryvyi Rih (1761); 
church of St. Michael in Kryvyi Rih (1793); 
 church of the Nativity of the Theotokos (1886); 
 church of the Protection of the Most Blessed Virgin Mary (1888); 
 church of the Ascension of the Lord (1904).

References
 Monasteries and Convents of Kryvyi Rih Diocese — UOC Synod Commission for Monasteries
 Google-map: Monasteries and Convents of Kryvyi Rih Diocese — UOC Synod Commission for Monasteries 
Божко А. А. Храм Рождества Пресвятой Богородицы (1886—2012): Исторический очерк / Алексей Алексеевич Божко. — Кривой Рог, 2012. — 84 с., ил.
Митрофан (Божко), иерод., Охинченко А.Ф. Покровская церковь на Карнаватке (1884–1964–1999–2014): Исторический очерк. — Кривой Рог, 2016. — 64 с.: ил.
Божко О. Свято-Покровський храм села Лозуватка // Дні науки історичного факультету: Матеріали VI Міжнародної наукової конференції молодих учених. — Вип. VI: у 8-ми част. / Редкол.: чл.-кор. НАНУ, проф. В. Ф. Колесник (голова), доц. О. Ю. Комаренко (заст. голови), І. В. Семеніст (відп. редактор) та ін. — Ч 1. — К., 2013. — С.4–5. 
Митрофан (Божко), ієрод. Вознесенська церква Кривого Рогу (1904—1934): символ покоління // Придніпровські соціально-гуманітарні читання. Матер. ІІІ всеукр. наук. конфер. з міжнар. участю. (м. Кіровоград, 16 травня 2014 р.): у 3-х частинах. — Д.: ТОВ «Інновація», 2014. — Ч. 3. — С.196–199.
Божко О. Свято-Михайлівський храм у Веселих Тернах (місто Кривий Ріг). Сайт храму Різдва Пресвятої Богородиці.
Митрофан (Божко), ієром. Закриття і знищення храмів та молитовних споруд у Кривому Розі під час хрущовської антирелігійної кампанії 1958–1964 рр. // Церква мучеників: гоніння на віру та Церкву у ХХ столітті: матеріали Міжнар. наук. конф. (К., 6–7 лютого 2020 р.) / упоряд. С.В. Шумило; відп. ред. прот. В. Савельєв. — К.: Видавничий відділ Української Православної Церкви, 2020. — С.550–563.
Божко О.О. Кривий Ріг у архіпастирському служінні священномученика Онуфрія (Гагалюка) // Гуманітарний журнал. — 2010. — №3–4. — С.107–112. 

Ukrainian Orthodox Church (Moscow Patriarchate)
Religion in Kryvyi Rih
Eastern Orthodox dioceses in Ukraine